Pre-flight or Preflight may refer to:
 Walk-around, the pre-flight inspection of an aircraft by its pilot or flight engineer
 Pre-flight (printing), by analogy with the above
 Preflight (EP), a 2002 EP by Building 429
 Preflight request, a request made by modern web browsers to perform certain cross-origin resource sharing